Baby, the Stars Shine Bright is the third studio album by British musical duo Everything but the Girl. It was released on 25 August 1986 by Blanco y Negro Records. The album was reissued in 2012 as a remastered two-disc deluxe set by Edsel Records.

The Japanese Lolita fashion clothing store Baby, The Stars Shine Bright was named after the album.

Track listing

2012 Edsel Records reissue

Personnel
Everything but the Girl
 Tracey Thorn – vocals
 Ben Watt – guitar, orchestral arrangements 
Additional musicians
 Micky Harris – bass
 Cara Tivey – organ, piano
 Rob Peters – drums
 Jeff Daly, Philip Todd, Peter King, Nigel Nash, Ray Swinfield – saxophone
 Alan Downey, Derek Watkins, Luke Tunney, Stuart Brooks – trumpet
 Andy Fawbert, Peter Thoms, Chris Pyne, Alan Hutt – trombone
 James Handy, John Pigneguy – French horn
 Gavyn Wright, Wilfred Gibson, John Willison, Richard Studt, Dave Woodcock, James Archer, Levine Andrade, Basil Smart, Bill Benham, Peter Oxer, Tim Good – violin
 Kenneth Essex, George Robertson, Cathy Stevens, David Emanuel, Roger Garland – viola
 Chris Green, Paul Kegg, Helen Liebmann, Clive Anstee – cello
 Clare Torry, Linda Allen, Bob Saker, Lance Ellington, Gary Taylor, Tony Burrows, Vicky Silva, Tessa Niles – backing vocals
 Steve Henderson, Joao Bosco De Oliveira, Frank Ricotti, Martin Ditcham – percussion
 Nick Ingman – conductor, director
Technical
Caryn Gough – artwork
Richard Haughton – photography

Charts

Certifications

References 

Everything but the Girl albums
1986 albums
Albums produced by Mike Hedges
Blanco y Negro Records albums